Giacomo Ferrazzo (born 2 March 1999) is an Italian footballer who plays as a defender.

Career

Como
In July 2019, Ferrazzo moved to Como, signing a three-year contract. He made his league debut for the club on 24 November 2019, coming on as an 84th minute substitute for Gabriele De Nuzzo in a 4–1 victory over Pianese. On 22 January 2021, his contract was terminated by mutual consent.

References

External links

1999 births
Living people
S.S. Juve Stabia players
Como 1907 players
Serie C players
Italian footballers
Association football defenders
People from San Donà di Piave
Sportspeople from the Metropolitan City of Venice
Footballers from Veneto